The HTC Incredible S (S710E) (s710d), also known as the Incredible 2, is a smartphone designed and manufactured by Taiwan's HTC Corporation originally running the Android 2.2 operating system (since upgraded to 2.3.4 Gingerbread and followed by 4.0.4 Ice Cream Sandwich except for US Droid Incredible 2). Officially announced by HTC on February 15, 2011 at MWC 2011 in Barcelona, Spain, alongside the HTC Desire S and the HTC Wildfire S, the HTC Incredible S was launched exclusively in the UK to Carphone Warehouse and Best Buy on February 26, 2011 marketed by Sarah Harding of Girls Aloud.

The Incredible S is the successor to the Droid Incredible.

History

Development 

During development, the device was codenamed Vivo and little was known about it before release. It is available as a CDMA variant on the US network Verizon as of May 2011 under the name Droid Incredible 2, and it is a world phone able to access both GSM and CDMA networks.

Hardware 

The HTC Incredible S is the latest of a long line of smartphones based around the 1 GHz Snapdragon chipset made by Qualcomm. In terms of hardware, it is very similar to the Desire HD with a few notable differences:

 Smaller screen: 4.0" compared to 4.3"
 Larger Battery: 1,450 mAh compared to 1230mAh
 Screen technology: An S-LCD screen compared to the original Desire's AMOLED display. However, the Desire's screen was replaced with an S-LCD on later versions.  
 Addition of a 1.3 MP fixed-focus front-facing camera for video calling

In a move seen as a new trend for HTC, the antenna for the phone is built into the back cover of the case (this is also true of the HTC Sensation). A unique feature of the Incredible S is the auto-rotating nature of the capacitive buttons below the screen.

Despite HTC recent design trend, the back is made of a rubberised plastic instead an aluminium body, presumably to help improve signal reception. The front is mainly covered by a sheet of Gorilla Glass, with a thin aluminium surround. In addition to the specification already mentioned, the Incredible S houses dual microphones for noise cancellation.

Regional variations 

The version that has been made available in Canada for reviewers has been seen to have chrome accents around the screen, speaker grill, camera lens, LED flash bulbs and loudspeaker which the European and Asian version do not have. A red version is in production and has been spotted in Hong Kong and Singapore.

As of November 24, 2011, the HTC Droid Incredible 2 has been available in a limited edition red color, instead of the usual black.

Software 

HTC announced that the Incredible S will be upgradable to the Android 4.0 ICS, though the software update still has not been released for its U.S. counterpart, the Droid Incredible 2, more than two years later. The device was shipped with the second version of HTC's Sense, which includes satellite navigation software developed by TomTom using maps from Route66 (30 day free trial included) and a digital bookstore from Kobo fully integrated into the system. For the UK release, the UK and Northern Ireland maps are pre-loaded onto the bundled 8 GB microSD card. The device is a part of the new generation of HTC phones that have a signed bootloader. As a consequence, the phone cannot be easily rooted, and the user is denied administrative rights to the phone. However, users have achieved root despite the signed bootloader.

See also 
 HTC Desire S
 HTC Desire HD
 Galaxy Nexus
 Comparison of smartphones

References

External links 
 HTC Incredible S Official Website

Incredible S
Mobile phones introduced in 2011
Android (operating system) devices
Discontinued smartphones
Mobile phones with user-replaceable battery
de:HTC Incredible S
mn:HTC Incredible S